The 2013 Colonial Athletic Association baseball tournament was held at Eagle Field at Veterans Memorial Park in Harrisonburg, Virginia, from May 22 through 25.  In the championship game, fourth-seeded  defeated second-seeded , 5-2, to win its first tournament championship.  As a result, Towson earned the Colonial Athletic Association's automatic bid to the 2013 NCAA Division I baseball tournament.

Seeding and format
Continuing the format adopted in 2012, the top six finishers from the regular season competed in the double-elimination tournament.  The top two seeds received a single bye to the second round.  Due to their planned departure from the CAA after this season, Old Dominion and Georgia State were not eligible for the tournament.

Bracket

All-Tournament Team
The following players were named to the All-Tournament Team.

Most Valuable Player
Towson's Zach Fisher was named the tournament's Most Valuable Player. In the tournament, Fisher batted .476 with three home runs and 10 RBI.

References

Tournament
Colonial Athletic Association Baseball Tournament
Colonial Athletic Association baseball tournament
Colonial Athletic Association baseball tournament
Baseball in Virginia
College sports in Virginia
Sports competitions in Virginia
Tourist attractions in Harrisonburg, Virginia